Risky Creek is a stream in North Slope Borough, Alaska, in the United States. It flows to the Chukchi Sea.

Risky Creek was so named in 1953 because it is considered the last landing spot for boats for several miles.

See also
List of rivers of Alaska

References

Rivers of North Slope Borough, Alaska
Rivers of Alaska